Paneer tikka masala is an Indian dish of paneer tikka cheese served in a spiced gravy. It is a vegetarian alternative to chicken tikka masala.

Gallery

See also

References

Punjabi cuisine
Indian cheese dishes